Nolita is the fourth studio album by French musician Keren Ann. The album was released on 21 December 2004 in France and on 15 March 2005 in the United States. It is her second English-language album, containing tracks sung both in English and in French.

Critical reception 

In a positive review, AllMusic's Thom Jurek said that both the lyrics and instrumentation have substance and called Nolita "utterly beguiling ... assured, statuesque, and fully realized." In a negative review for The Village Voice, Robert Christgau panned Ann for celebrating melancholy and for lacking rhythm: "[T]he languor she encourages in her quiet cult is the kind of privilege that feels like an accomplishment to Nick Drake and Sylvia Plath fans."

Track listing

Charts

References 

Keren Ann albums
2004 albums
EMI Records albums